In probability theory, the theory of large deviations concerns the asymptotic behaviour of remote tails of sequences of probability distributions. While some basic ideas of the theory can be traced to Laplace, the formalization started with insurance mathematics, namely ruin theory with Cramér and Lundberg. A unified formalization of large deviation theory was developed in 1966, in a paper by Varadhan. Large deviations theory formalizes the heuristic ideas of concentration of measures and widely generalizes the notion of convergence of probability measures.

Roughly speaking, large deviations theory concerns itself with the exponential decline of the probability measures of certain kinds of extreme or tail events.

Introductory examples

An elementary example 
Consider a sequence of independent tosses of a fair coin. The possible outcomes could be heads or tails. Let us denote the possible outcome of the i-th trial by  where we encode head as 1 and tail as 0. Now let  denote the mean value after  trials, namely

Then  lies between 0 and 1.

Also, it does not provide information about the convergence of the tail probabilities as  However, the large deviation theory can provide answers for such problems.

Let us make this statement more precise. For a given value  let us compute the tail probability  Define

Then by Chernoff's inequality, it can be shown that  This bound is rather sharp, in the sense that  cannot be replaced with a larger number which would yield a strict inequality for all positive  (However, the exponential bound can still be reduced by a subexponential factor on the order of  this follows from the Stirling approximation applied to the binomial coefficient appearing in the Bernoulli distribution.) Hence, we obtain the following result:

This formula approximates any tail probability of the sample mean of i.i.d. variables and gives its convergence as the number of samples increases.

Large deviations for sums of independent random variables 

In the above example of coin-tossing we explicitly assumed that each toss is an
independent trial, and the probability of getting head or tail is always the same.

Let  be independent and identically distributed (i.i.d.) random variables whose common distribution satisfies a certain growth condition. Then the following limit exists:

Here

as before.

Function  is called the "rate function" or "Cramér function" or sometimes the "entropy function".

The above-mentioned limit means that for large 

which is the basic result of large deviations theory.

If we know the probability distribution of  an explicit expression for the rate function can be obtained. This is given by a Legendre–Fenchel transformation,

where

is called the cumulant generating function (CGF) and  denotes the mathematical expectation.

If  follows a normal distribution, the rate function becomes a parabola with its apex at the mean of the normal distribution.

If  is a Markov chain, the variant of the basic large deviations result stated above may hold.

Formal definition
Given a Polish space  let  be a sequence of Borel probability measures on  let  be a sequence of positive real numbers such that  and finally let  be a lower semicontinuous functional on  The sequence  is said to satisfy a large deviation principle with speed  and rate  if, and only if, for each Borel measurable set 

where  and  denote respectively the closure and interior of

Brief history 
The first rigorous results concerning large deviations are due to the Swedish mathematician Harald Cramér, who applied them to model the insurance business. From the point
of view of an insurance company, the earning is at a constant rate per month (the monthly premium) but the claims come randomly. For the company to be successful over a certain period of time (preferably many months), the total earning should exceed the total claim. Thus to estimate the premium you have to ask the following question: "What should we choose as the premium  such that over  months the total claim  should be less than  This is clearly the same question asked by the large deviations theory. Cramér gave a solution to this question for i.i.d. random variables, where the rate function is expressed as a power series.

A very incomplete list of mathematicians who have made important advances would include Petrov, Sanov, S.R.S. Varadhan (who has won the Abel prize for his contribution to the theory), D. Ruelle, O.E. Lanford, Amir Dembo, and Ofer Zeitouni.

Applications
Principles of large deviations may be effectively applied to gather information out of a probabilistic model. Thus, theory of large deviations finds its applications in information theory and risk management. In physics, the best known application of large deviations theory arise in thermodynamics and statistical mechanics (in connection with relating entropy with rate function).

Large deviations and entropy 

The rate function is related to the entropy in statistical mechanics. This can be heuristically seen in the following way. In statistical mechanics the entropy of a particular macro-state is related to the number of micro-states which corresponds to this macro-state. In our coin tossing example the mean value  could designate a particular macro-state. And the particular sequence of heads and tails which gives rise to a particular value of  constitutes a particular micro-state. Loosely speaking a macro-state having a higher number of micro-states giving rise to it, has higher entropy. And a state with higher entropy has a higher chance of being realised in actual experiments. The macro-state with mean value of 1/2 (as many heads as tails) has the highest number of micro-states giving rise to it and it is indeed the state with the highest entropy. And in most practical situations we shall indeed obtain this macro-state for large numbers of trials. The "rate function" on the other hand measures the probability of appearance of a particular macro-state. The smaller the rate function the higher is the chance of a macro-state appearing. In our coin-tossing the value of the "rate function" for mean value equal to 1/2 is zero. In this way one can see the "rate function" as the negative of the "entropy".

There is a relation between the "rate function" in large deviations theory and the Kullback–Leibler divergence, the connection is established by Sanov's theorem (see Sanov and 
Novak, ch. 14.5).

In a special case, large deviations are closely related to the concept of Gromov–Hausdorff limits.

See also 
 Large deviation principle
 Cramér's large deviation theorem
 Chernoff's inequality
 Sanov's theorem
 Contraction principle (large deviations theory), a result on how large deviations principles "push forward"
 Freidlin–Wentzell theorem, a large deviations principle for Itō diffusions
 Legendre transformation, Ensemble equivalence is based on this transformation. 
 Laplace principle, a large deviations principle in Rd
 Laplace's method
 Schilder's theorem, a large deviations principle for Brownian motion
 Varadhan's lemma
 Extreme value theory
 Large deviations of Gaussian random functions

References

Bibliography
 Special invited paper: Large deviations by S. R. S. Varadhan The Annals of Probability 2008, Vol. 36, No. 2, 397–419 
 A basic introduction to large deviations: Theory, applications, simulations, Hugo Touchette, arXiv:1106.4146.
 Entropy, Large Deviations and Statistical Mechanics by R.S. Ellis, Springer Publication. 
 Large Deviations for Performance Analysis by Alan Weiss and Adam Shwartz. Chapman and Hall 
 Large Deviations Techniques and Applications by Amir Dembo and Ofer Zeitouni. Springer 
 Random Perturbations of Dynamical Systems by M.I. Freidlin and A.D. Wentzell. Springer 
 "Large Deviations for Two Dimensional Navier-Stokes Equation with Multiplicative Noise", S. S. Sritharan and P. Sundar, Stochastic Processes and Their Applications, Vol. 116 (2006) 1636–1659.
"Large Deviations for the Stochastic Shell Model of Turbulence", U. Manna, S. S. Sritharan and P. Sundar, NoDEA Nonlinear Differential Equations Appl. 16 (2009), no. 4, 493–521.

 
Asymptotic analysis
Asymptotic theory (statistics)